Boa Vista do Ramos (Good View of Branches) is a municipality located in the Brazilian state of Amazonas. Its population was 19,626 (2020) and its area is 2,587 km2.

References

Municipalities in Amazonas (Brazilian state)